PDIC may refer to:
Professional Diving Instructors Corporation
Plymouth Devon International College
Philippine Deposit Insurance Corporation
Public Demands Implementation Convention a political party from Meghalaya, India active from 1977 to 1997